Mitra is a large genus of medium to large predatory sea snails, marine gastropod mollusks in the family Mitridae, the miter shells or mitre snails.

This genus is named after the ecclesiastical headgear, the miter, because of the shells' general shape.

These sea snails create shells that are considered attractive by shell collectors; the shells are solid, high-spired and are often colorful.

Species
Many species that were previously in the genus Mitra have been reassigned in the past years to other genera, including Calcimitra, Gemmulimitra, Isara, Nebularia, Neotiara, Pseudonebularia, Quasimitra, Roseomitra, Strigatella and Vexillum. According to the World Register of Marine Species, the following species with accepted names are currently included within the genus Mitra:
{{linked species list
|Mitra abbatis| Perry, 1811
|Mitra deprofundis| Turner, 2001
|Mitra dolorosa| Dall, 1903 (taxon inquirendum) 
|† Mitra fusiformis|(Brocchi, 1814) 
|† Mitra hectori| Hutton, 1905 
|Mitra inca| d'Orbigny, 1841
|Mitra lima| G. B. Sowerby II, 1874
|Mitra magnifica| Poppe & Tagaro, 2006
|Mitra marciae| G. B. Sowerby III, 1913 (uncertain)
|Mitra mitra|Linnaeus, 1758
|Mitra papalis| (Linnaeus, 1758)
|Mitra stictica| (Link, 1807) 
|† Mitra subscrobiculata| d'Orbigny, 1852 
|Mitra turgida| Reeve, 1845}}

Species in this genus also include:Powell A. W. B., New Zealand Mollusca, William Collins Publishers Ltd, Auckland, New Zealand 1979 

 Mitra brasiliensis Oliveira, 1869
 Mitra saldanha Matthews & Rios, 1970

Species brought into synonymy
 Mitra albozonata W. H. Turton, 1932: synonym of Quasimitra latruncularia (Reeve, 1844)
 Mitra articulata Reeve, 1845: synonym of Vexillum articulatum (Reeve, 1845)
 Mitra aubryana Hervier, 1897: synonym of Vexillum fortiplicatum (Pease, 1868)
 Mitra bifasciata Swainson, 1822: synonym of Vexillum caffrum (Linnaeus, 1758)
 † Mitra fusioides Lea, 1833: synonym of Conomitra fusoides (I. Lea, 1833) 
 Mitra granata Reeve, 1845: synonym of Nebularia pellisserpentis (Reeve, 1844)
 Mitra grelloisi Récluz, 1853: synonym of Nebularia pellisserpentis (Reeve, 1844)
 Mitra infrafasciata Souverbie, 1865: synonym of Pusia microzonias (Lamarck, 1811)
 Mitra latruncularia Reeve, 1844 synonym of Quasimitra latruncularia (Reeve, 1844) 
 Mitra lurida W. H. Turton, 1932: synonym of Vexillum patulum (Reeve, 1845)
 Mitra multisulcata G. B. Sowerby III, 1914: synonym of Strigatella subruppelli (Finlay, 1927)
 Mitra muricata (Broderip, 1836): synonym of Neotiara muricata (Broderip, 1836)
 Mitra oniscina Lamarck, 1811: synonym of Vexillum oniscinum (Lamarck, 1811)
 Mitra uzielliana Crosse, 1861: synonym of Nebularia pellisserpentis (Reeve, 1844)
 Mitra variabilis Reeve, 1844: synonym of Quasimitra variabilis (Reeve, 1844)
 Mitra vezzaronellyae Cossignani, 2016: synonym of Nebularia peasei (Dohrn, 1860)
 Mitra zonalis Quoy & Gaimard, 1833: synonym of Vexillum caffrum (Linnaeus, 1758)

Gallery

References

External links
 Fedosov A., Puillandre N., Herrmann M., Kantor Yu., Oliverio M., Dgebuadze P., Modica M.V. & Bouchet P. (2018). The collapse of Mitra: molecular systematics and morphology of the Mitridae (Gastropoda: Neogastropoda). Zoological Journal of the Linnean Society. 183(2): 253-337

 
Mitridae
Gastropod genera